Gary Wilson (born October 23, 1953) is an American experimental musician and performance artist best known for his 1977 album You Think You Really Know Me, after, he released 3 more recordings: “Midnight Hour/When I Spoke Of Love” and “Forgotten Lovers EP” (1979) “Invasion Of Privacy” (1980), and “This Is Why I Wear My Wedding Gown” (1983). Shortly after, he promptly retired from recording and kept performing until 1983. He slowly gained a strong cult following during the 1980s and 1990s, and in the early 2000s became active again. As of 2020, he has released fourteen full-length albums.

Biography

Early life 
Born on the north side of Endicott, New York, Wilson was one of four siblings, the others being Larry, David and Patti. The children kept several ducks as pets. His father worked for IBM during the day, and by night played stand-up bass in a lounge band whose act played the same hotel approximately four nights a week for 25 years. Wilson was a self-taught musician and musical prodigy, being proficient in guitar, bass, drums, piano and cello by the time he entered grade school. He has credited his earliest influences to be Fabian, Bobby Rydell and most of all Dion. His mother would curl the front of his hair for him every morning so that he could look like his teen heart-throb idols.

At age 10, Wilson joined his school band, playing stand-up bass. The following year, he wrote his first song. At 12, Wilson started acquiring tape machines and began recording songs in his parents' basement. Around this time, he became fascinated by The Beatles and rock and roll (he attended The Beatles' famous 1965 Shea Stadium concert). About a year later, he began playing keyboards; most instances he played a Farfisa Organ, in a band called Lord Fuzz. They cut a single when he was only in eighth grade. The group even earned a spot on a bill opening for The 1910 Fruitgum Company. When the band's lead singer left, Wilson took over vocals and songwriting, but quickly proved to be too strange for the other members.

In 1969, Wilson discovered the music of aleatoric composer John Cage. When sought out, Cage surprisingly invited the 14-year-old musician into his home to discuss and critique music for several days. Wilson was also given advice by the composer, such as if your music/performance "doesn't irritate people, you aren't doing your job." This experience is deemed by many to be a significant event in Wilson's life, and his songs became increasingly experimental after this point. Wilson has also cited avant-garde composer David Tudor as a major influence during this time. Upon graduation from high school in 1970, he moved to New York City for several weeks, but quickly returned to his parents' home in Endicott, New York. Around this time, Wilson "fell right into" playing lounge music on the side, just as his father had.

You Think You Really Know Me 
Wilson went to Albert Grossman's Bearsville Studios in Woodstock, New York in 1976, a well-known recording studio that has played host to sessions by Bob Dylan, R.E.M., Patti Smith, The Rolling Stones and many other notable acts. There, Wilson recorded versions of "6.4 = Make Out", "Chromium Bitch", "Groovy Girls", and "I Want To Lose Control". He eventually decided that he would prefer to record at his familiar home studio and finished recording You Think You Really Know Me, his first album, in his parents' basement. On this recording, Wilson sometimes played solo and was other times accompanied by a backing band, The Blind Dates. He pressed, distributed, funded and released the album himself. Wilson pressed 300 copies in 1977 and a further 300 copies in 1979 (he now claims that he only has two original copies left in his personal possession from these pressings). In 1991, Cry Baby Records re-released the album, pressing about 1000 copies.

His 1970s concert performances were cited as bizarre and outrageous, a "show that included cellophane, duct tape, bed sheets, fake blood, flour, and milk." So outlandish were the shows that often they would have their electricity cut in attempts to get them to leave the stage. After receiving a small amount of radio play, Wilson decided to try and pursue landing a record deal and moved west to California in 1978. There he recorded three singles, In the Midnight Hour/When I Spoke of Love (1978), Forgotten Lovers E.P. (1979) and Invasion of Privacy (1980). Although he did have some supporters (receiving fanmail during the period from the band The Residents), viable commercial success did not find Wilson.

Rediscovery and documentary
After a 1981 American tour, he retired from the experimental music scene and dropped off the public radar. Wilson then lapsed into obscurity until around 1996, when Beck was heard citing him as an influence in concerts, at award ceremonies, and on his album, Odelay. Beck also namechecked the musician in his hit single "Where It's At": "Passin' the dutchie from coast to coast/like my man Gary Wilson rocks the most." Around the same time, he was cited by the people behind Sub Pop Records as a major influence on their company.

In the early 2000s, Motel Records began a search to find the reclusive musician, but were unsuccessful (even after hiring a private detective). He was eventually found through contacting ex-band members. He was nearly 50 years old, working part-time at The Jolar Cinema adult theater, playing keyboard in a weekly jazz act called Donnie Finnell & Company East at the Rancho Bernardino Lounge and living with his girlfriend (an experimental artist who had studied at UCSD in the 1980s) in San Diego. He gave Motel Records his permission to repress You Think You Really Know Me, and also offered to play a handful of shows to promote the rerelease.

On May 16, 2002 Wilson returned to the stage after a 20-year absence, playing two shows at Joe's Pub in downtown Manhattan. A documentary about Wilson's career and his return to the public stage was filmed by  Michael Wolk, titled You Think You Really Know Me: The Gary Wilson Story. The film recorded the musician's long and emotional train ride (due to his fear of flying from a past tour. His fear originates from his face being distorted after a flight for a show/interview.) from the west coast back to his native New York for his first concert in decades. The film was screened at several theaters in 2005, and was released on home video by Plexifilm in June 2008. Wilson said attending the film's premier at the Lincoln Center in New York was "one of the highlights of my life."

Motel Records soon after put out Forgotten Lovers, a collection of singles, B-sides, rare and unreleased songs dating back to 1974. In 2004, Wilson released Mary Had Brown Hair on Stones Throw Records, his first album of original material in almost 30 years. In 2005 he played instruments and co-produced "Rain of Earth" as one of the 'Stones Throw Singers' on a tribute album to Bruce Haack titled Dimension Mix. In 2006, his website stated that a greatest hits album was in the works, supposedly to feature tracks from You Think You Really Know Me and Forgotten Lovers; however, no further plans for the album have been revealed and it may have been scrapped. Wilson continues to occasionally perform live, touring Europe twice with the Austin Blind Dates, and usually playing in California, where he resides.  

According to Wilson's MySpace account, the musician resided in San Diego, California. As of mid 2008, his lounge act band was still together, playing their regular Friday and Saturday night slot at Bistro 221 in Escondido, as well as playing for-hire at special events and country clubs, covering songs by Nat King Cole, Lou Rawls, Wayne Newton, Johnny Mathis, etc. He also stated that he had recently come back in to email contact with the infamous "Linda" featured in many of his songs. Although they were able to resolve some old issues, the woman is now married and Wilson said of the situation, "I don't think it's cool to get between people."

2000s–2010s

In May 2008, Wilson's website announced that a new album, Lisa Wants To Talk To You, was in the works. The record was set to be released on Human Ear Music on August 15, 2008 but the release was delayed for unknown reasons until September 15. Western Vinyl released Gary Wilson's new album Electric Endicott in the fall of 2010. The album is available on CD, vinyl, and MP3. To promote his new album, Wilson performed on the October 27, 2010 episode of Late Night with Jimmy Fallon with members of the Roots acting as his backing band. In July 2011 Stones Throw Records released a direct-to-vinyl live recording from a performance earlier that year.

Wilson was slated in November 2011 to release a new digital album, "Feel the Beat," on Tip Records, a music-business incubator created by rock critic Robert Duncan as an exploratory arm of Duncan/Channon A limited number of copies are to be released on CD and vinyl as well. In 2012, Wilson was featured on the song "Sweden" from rapper/producer Pyramid Vritra's album "Pyramid", and in 2013 he was featured on the song "Sandy Kissed Gary Wilson Last Night" from production duo They Hate Change's album "Today."

In May 2013, Wilson made his first appearance outside the US for a European tour with The Blind Dates of TX playing the Netherlands, Germany, Spain, UK, Belgium, and the Villette Sonique Festival in Paris. Wilson and the TX Blind Dates returned abroad for a second European tour in 2014 where they played Czech Republic, Germany, France, Belgium, and headlined Sunday night at the OFF Fest in Katowice, Poland. The touring band consisted of Patrick Healy (percussion, vocals), Jason “Chef” Pittman (drums), Sam Vandelinder (guitar, organ, synthesizer), Paul Millar (bass guitar, synthesizer), and T.W. Bond (keyboards).

In 2014, Electric Six recorded a cover of "Gary's in the Park" as part of a pledge package for their Absolute Treasure Kickstarter campaign. The cover was subsequently released online.

In January 2014, Wilson and long-time contemporary (also one-time art mail exchange colleague back in the 1970s) R. Stevie Moore finally received the chance to share the same stage for two nights in Brooklyn, NY. On January 24, 2014, both were invited as guest artists at Issue Project Room where R Stevie performed a solo set and Gary debuted a rarely performed piece titled "Gary Saw Linda Kissing John Cage". The performance piece paid much respect to Wilson's avant garde and cable access roots involving light arrangements of prerecorded Musique Conrete/electronic noise style samples, Wilson improvising on a baby grand piano, and the improvisational accompaniment of the TX Blind Dates Electronic Choir (Paul Millar, Chef Pittman, Sam Vandelinder, Patrick Healy, and T.W. Bond).

In 2015, Wilson made a surprise guest appearance on Jimmy Kimmel Live! during a performance by Earl Sweatshirt and BadBadNotGood. Early that year, Earl sampled Wilson's song "You Were Too Good to Be True" on his song "Grief" from the album I Don't Like Shit, I Don't Go Outside.

In 2019, Gary and R. Stevie Moore visited each other and created an album together called "Fake News Trending". Other artists appear in the album too. They also released a single called Hey Gary (Have You Seen My Girl) with the album.

Discography

Albums
 Another Galaxy (1974)
 You Think You Really Know Me (1977, reissued 1991 and 2002)
 Forgotten Lovers (2003, reissued 2011 on vinyl)
 Mary Had Brown Hair (2004)
 Lisa Wants To Talk To You (2008)
 Electric Endicott (2010)
 Feel the Beat (2011)
 Alone With Gary Wilson (2015)
 It's Friday Night with Gary Wilson (2016)
 It's Christmas Time with Gary Wilson (2016)
 Let's Go to Outer Space (2017)
 The King of Endicott (2019)
 Fake News Trending (2019) (with R. Stevie Moore)
 Tormented (2020)

Singles
 Dream(s)/Soul Travel (1973)
 Another Galaxy/Softly the Water Flows (1973–1974)
 In the Midnight Hour/When I Spoke of Love (1978)
 Forgotten Lovers E.P. (1979)
 Invasion of Privacy (double 7") (1980)
 This Is Why I Wear My Wedding Gown E.P. (1983)
 Newark Valley (2004)
 6.4 = Make Out (demo version) (2004)
 My Eyes Are Closed/My Dream Is Yours (Flexi, 7", Single Sided, Blue, Ltd Numbered) (2011)
 Sea Cruise (7" Ltd) (Rita Records) (2014)
 Hey Gary (Have You Seen My Girl) (2019) (with R. Stevie Moore)

References

External links

Gary Wilson's Myspace
"Peeling Back The Gauze: Gary Wilson Uncovered" interview/article in MungBeing
Stones Throw Records
Western Vinyl
Gary Wilson interview and feature at Blurt Online
Gary Wilson interview with Drastic Plastic Dress
April 2008 Interview with L.A. Record
- Gary Wilson interview, bio, archive photos, and cartoons in the San Diego Reader

American experimental musicians
American multi-instrumentalists
1953 births
Living people
Outsider musicians
Stones Throw Records artists
People from Endicott, New York
Western Vinyl artists